Bahman Kamel; is an Iranian football defender who plays for Oxin in the Azadegan League.

Club career

Machine Sazi
He joined Machine Sazi in summer 2008 and spent four seasons with Tabrizi side in Division 1 and Division 2.

Naft Tehran
He joined Naft Tehran in summer 2012. He spent two seasons in Naft Tehran and made 35 appearances without scoring.

Foolad
After two season at Naft, he signed a one-year contract with Iranian League title holder, Foolad at the deadline of the summer transfer window. He made his debut for Foolad in the second fixture of the 2014–15 Iran Pro League against Persepolis as a substitute for Yousef Vakia.

Club career statistics

References

External links
 Bahman Kamel at PersianLeague.com
 Bahman Kamel at IranLeague.ir

Living people
Iranian footballers
Machine Sazi F.C. players
Naft Tehran F.C. players
Foolad FC players
1986 births
Sportspeople from Tabriz
Association football defenders